Adam Peterman (born August 11, 1995) is an American professional ultra-distance and marathon runner.

Running career

High school record
Adam Peterman graduated from Hellgate High School class of 2013 is a Missoula, Montana native and 2013 Montana High School Association class AA 3200 m champion.

Adam Peterman set Hellgate High School school records in 3 events 800-meters: 1:58, 1,600-meters: 4:17 & 3,200-meters: 8:57.

NCAA record
Adam Peterman earned All-Pacific-12 Conference honors after earning bronze and honorable mention All-American honors in 2016 in the steeplechase.

Peterman graduated with environmental studies and geology degrees magna cum laude.

Professional career
Peterman is a two-time US trail national champion in the marathon.

Peterman's 2022 ultra marathon results ended with 4 consecutive win culminating in 2 gold medals at 2022 World Mountain and Trail Running Championships. USA Track & Field Mountain Ultra Trail (MUT) Running Council of long distance running has named Adam Peterman one of the 2022 USATF MUT Runners of the Year.

Adam Peterman's name was known by few in the trail community through late 2021, when he destroyed the field at the JFK 50 Miler and nearly broke a course record many assumed was indestructible.

References

External links
 
 
 Adam Peterman Track bio Colorado Buffaloes
 Adam Peterman Cross Country bio Colorado Buffaloes
 Adam Peterman, 2022 Trail World Championships 80k Champion, Interview IRunFar.com

1995 births
Living people
American male long-distance runners
American male ultramarathon runners
World Athletics Championships athletes for the United States
American male steeplechase runners
Colorado Buffaloes men's track and field athletes
University of Colorado alumni
Track and field athletes from Montana
Sportspeople from Missoula, Montana
People from Missoula, Montana